Sanford is a lunar impact crater that is located in the northern latitudes on the Moon's far side. It lies to the south-southeast of the crater Klute, and just to the west-northwest of Teisserenc. To the southwest lies Joule.

This is a circular crater formation with a worn outer rim. A pair of small craterlets lies along the eastern rim, and the satellite crater Sanford C is attached to the outer edge along the north-northwest. Attached to the southern exterior is what may be the remains of a larger, unnamed crater that is now considerably eroded.

Satellite craters
By convention these features are identified on lunar maps by placing the letter on the side of the crater midpoint that is closest to Sanford.

References

 
 
 
 
 
 
 
 
 
 
 
 

Impact craters on the Moon